Balūchī (also Baluchi and Balūči) is a town in Herat Province, Afghanistan.

See also
Herat Province

References

Populated places in Herat Province